Maksim Vyacheslavovich Lauk (born 22 January 1995) is a Russian football player of German descent. He plays for FC Kuban Krasnodar.

Club career
He made his debut in the Russian Professional Football League for FC Dynamo Kirov on 20 July 2015 in a game against FC Syzran-2003.

He made his Russian Football National League debut for FC Shinnik Yaroslavl on 11 July 2016 in a game against FC Baltika Kaliningrad.

References

External links
 Profile by Russian Professional Football League
 

1995 births
Sportspeople from Omsk
Russian people of German descent
Living people
Russian footballers
Association football midfielders
FC Amkar Perm players
FC Kuban Krasnodar players
FC Dynamo Kirov players
FC Shinnik Yaroslavl players
FC Tyumen players
FC Armavir players
FC Zvezda Perm players
FC Yenisey Krasnoyarsk players
FC Urozhay Krasnodar players
Russian First League players
Russian Second League players